Ismail bin Abdallah bin Abi al-Muhajir was an Umayyad governor of Ifriqiya (North Africa) from 718 to 720.

Ismail bin Abdallah bin Abu al-Muhajir (or al-Muhajjar) was from a client tribe of the Quraysh.

In 718, Ismail bin Abdallah was appointed by Caliph Umar bin AbdulAziz or Umar II to replace his predecessor's appointee, the unpopular Muhammad bin Yazid.  Ismail was one of the new crop of Umar II's competent governors, with instructions to improve the Kairouan administration and pursue the integration of  non-Arab Muslims into the empire, rather than treat them as conquered peoples.  As such, Ismail encouraged conversions among the Berbers of North Africa and curbed the abuses of the Arab military caste. Ismail adhered to Islamic law and eliminated extraordinary taxes and slave-tributes on Berber populations. He is credited for completing the conversion of the Berber population to Islam.

In a curious note, Ismail bin Abdallah was the first and only Umayyad governor of Ifriqiya who was not given supervisory authority over Iberia (al-Andalus).  In an unusual step, Caliph Umar II decided to appoint Al-Samh bin Malik al-Khawlani as the governor of al-Andalus directly, and made him directly answerable to Damascus, rather than going through Kairouan.

Ismail bin Abdallah's tenure was competent but short.  He was relieved of his post in 720 by Umar II's successor, Caliph Yazid II and replaced by the dubious Yazid bin Abi Muslim as governor in Kairouan.

See also 
History of early Islamic Tunisia
History of medieval Tunisia

References

Umayyad governors of Ifriqiya
8th-century rulers in Africa
8th-century Arabs
Tabi‘un hadith narrators
8th-century people of Ifriqiya